Norway sent a delegation to the second Winter Paralympics in 1980 in Geilo, Norway. The country was represented by thirty seven athletes, the second most of any nation after Austria. They sent twenty seven men and ten women. Norway won fifty four medals, the most of any country at the games. They won twenty three gold medals, twenty one silver and ten bronze.

Norway was able to send athletes of all physical disabilities, as all classes of athletes with physical disabilities were able to participate.

References 

Nations at the 1980 Winter Paralympics
1980 in Norwegian sport
Norway at the Paralympics